Lucille May Grace (October 3, 1900 – December 22, 1957) was an American politician who was the Louisiana Register of State Lands from 1931 to 1952 and again from 1956 to 1957. She was the state's first female statewide elected officeholder and first female gubernatorial candidate.

Biography
Born in Plaquemine, she graduated from Academy of the Sacred Heart, Grand Coteau, and received a Bachelor of Arts degree from the Louisiana State University, where she was the first female freshman treasurer.

After the death of her father, Fred J. Grace, on September 9, 1931, she was appointed to succeed him as Louisiana Register of State Lands by Governor Huey Long, before being elected in every leap-year election from 1932 to 1956 (except 1952). She also ran in the 1952 Louisiana gubernatorial election, making her the state's first female gubernatorial candidate.

After her unsuccessful gubernatorial bid in 1952, she took over her old position from Ellen Bryan Moore in 1956 before her death in Baton Rouge the next year. Her husband ran for the office in 1959 but Moore retained the seat.

She had one son with her husband Fred C. Dent. Despite being married, she kept her maiden name in order to maintain her recognition.

She was posthumously inducted to the Louisiana Center for Women in Government and Business Hall of Fame in 1995 and the Louisiana Political Museum and Hall of Fame in 2011.

Bibliography
 Garry Boulard, The Big Lie: Hale Boggs, Lucille May Grace and Leander Perez in 1951, Gretna, Louisiana: Pelican Publishing, 2001

See also
 List of the first women holders of political offices in North and Central America and the Caribbean

Notes

References

1900 births
1957 deaths
People from Plaquemine, Louisiana
Louisiana Democrats
Registers of the State Land Office of Louisiana
Politicians from Baton Rouge, Louisiana
Louisiana State University alumni
Women in Louisiana politics
20th-century American politicians
Burials in Louisiana
20th-century American women politicians